The Faust Hotel, once known as the Travelers Hotel, was completed in 1929 and is located in New Braunfels, Texas. The hotel planning was started by a group of citizens desiring to attract tourist and convention traffic to counter a downturn in agricultural business caused by a mid-1920s drought in the area. Built on donated land from Senator Joseph Faust's estate, the hotel was renamed in 1936 in honor that family. The building is a four-story masonry design of no particular architectural style, though with some Spanish Renaissance Revival detailing.

It has been renovated several times through the years, but is one of the few known Texas mid-rise hotels of its era still serving as a hotel. It was listed on the National Register of Historic Places in 1985.

Not to be confused with Hotel Faust (now Hotel Giles since 2015) in Comfort, Texas.

See also

National Register of Historic Places listings in Comal County, Texas
Recorded Texas Historic Landmarks in Comal County

References

External links

National Register of Historic Places in Comal County, Texas
New Braunfels, Texas
Recorded Texas Historic Landmarks